Eilema purpureotincta is a moth of the subfamily Arctiinae. It was described by Hervé de Toulgoët in 1954. It is found on Madagascar.

References

 

purpureotincta
Moths described in 1954